ITSUKA is a singer, songwriter whose musical range encompasses rock, blues, folk and country music.

Biography 
ITSUKA (Itsuka), from Tokyo, is a multi-talented musician who can not only write lyrics and music, but also handle everything from studio design, equipment setup, video production, and live streaming all on her own.

She has over a hundred original songs in Japanese and English influenced by rock, blues, folk, country, and other genres. While steadily establishing herself as a singer-songwriter, including winning the grand prize in HAKASE.COM's "Singer-Songwriter Contest 2017," she is also a standout presence in the musical instrument industry as a gear girl who loves guitars and digital equipment.

In music and musical instrument video contents, she is not only the host, but also involved in planning, directing, and video production.
She produced the music video "For A Friend" by Marty Friedman, involved in Char's workshop "SINGING GUITAR," Yamaha's "Let's ENJOY SYNCROOM," MIYAKO (LOVEBITES) "metal TV," Kotaro Oshio's "Oshio no oshi," and "The SAMURAI Road Crew," a program featuring guitar technicians of famous artists such as Tatsuro Yamashita and Kiyoshiro Imawano.
Her YouTube program "ITSUKA TV" has also been attracting a lot of attention.

He frequently participates in the world's largest musical instrument trade show, "NAMM SHOW," her live broadcast videos from the site in fluent English are gaining popularity. As an artist, he also appeared at the SHINOS AMPLIFIER booth. He is also active internationally, appearing in an American movie/providing the theme song, and participating in a European tour with a Japanese female band.

In April 2020, he opened "AMP UP," a live streaming and shooting studio specializing in music. So far, Marty Friedman, Char, Kiyotaka Sugiyama, Tamio Okuda, Yoshio Nomura, Kotaro Oshio, TRICERATOPS, Taigi Sato, DJ OSSHY, Nakamura Naka, MIYAKO (LOVEBITES), Miku Kobato (BAND-MAID) and others have used the studio's services.

She is highly regarded for her one-operation skills and has been responsible for the production of numerous tutorial videos for YAMAHA, ZOOM, etc. For Valentine's Day in 2021, she was the director for the Haruki Murakami Produce "MURAKAMI JAM ~No Bossa Nova ~ Blame it on the Bossa Nova" to commemorate the 50th anniversary of TOKYO FM. Currently, she is an OM (formerly OLYMPUS) ambassador.

In 2022, she is appearing in the promotion video of YAMAHA's remote ensemble app "SYNCROOM" and performing an original song, following her two previous videos for them. ITSUKA also produced the video.

In her private life, ITSUKA's love of red eye has grown to the point where she serves as the chairperson of the Red Eye Promotion Committee.
The theme song "Red Eye Blues," written by ITSUKA, is spreading nationwide.
Her hobbies include collecting hats (HAT Freak), red eye, and making friends all over the world.

History 

 2015 
 The band UNNATURAL, in which ITSUKA played vocals and guitar, decided to take a break. She started her solo career. In the same year, her first solo single "Connection" was released on September 1 and was used as the theme song for the American movie "Love in Tokyo".  [1]

 2016 
  Started a YouTube program "ITSUKA morning TV", in which he reviews musical instruments and conducts interviews. (The channel name will be changed to "ITSUKA TV" in 2021.)
  March 25 Single "SAKURA. LaLaLa" is released for distribution from HAT FreaK and is used as the commercial song for the women-only share house "Hanasakasu."
  In April, he accompanied the Japanese female band DIRTRUCKS on their European tour (UK, France, Germany, Poland) as bassist and MC in English.

 2017
  ITSUKA TV" made its first live-streaming of the NAMM SHOW, held in the United States. Since then, it has become an annual event.
  October 10 A six-song photobook "GUITARS & HATS" is released. She wrote all the lyrics, composed all the music, and played the guitar.
 December Wins the grand prize in HAKASE.COM's "Find a singer-songwriter! audition, winning the grand prize. The winning song was "W.A.B.K. " which had been popular in live performances for some time. 

 2018
 In January, he went to the "NAMM SHOW" in the U.S. again. In addition to covering his own show, he also works as a photographer for Player Magazine.
 April 17: Released the album "GUITARS & HATS" from HAT FreaK, which was released only as a photobook the previous year.

2019
  Started producing official tutorial videos for instruments and equipment. Regularly MC's and produces for ZOOM.
 Participated in "Sound Messe in Osaka" in May as an official reporter, responsible for SNS and YouTube marketing.
From October to December, he organized a D.I.Y.-style crowdfunding project "ITSUKA MUSIC VIDEO PROJECT", which reached its goal, and held a screening on December 5.

 2020
January 10 "MUSIC VIDEO PROJECT," a collection of songs produced through crowdfunding, is released from HAT FreaK, and "Wind and Breeze" is used as the theme song for "Honey Music Road.
 April 5 Opened the music and photography studio "AMP UP" and became the owner of the studio; Char, Yoshio Nomura, Tamio Okuda, Taigi Sato, and other big names also used the studio.
Increasingly, he also works as a delivery director for musicians' live delivery live on business trips, and is in charge of TRICERATOPS and other musicians.
 May The best album "Memory Card" by the band UNNATURAL is released. Proceeds are donated through the Red Cross.
 In September, he started producing the YouTube program "Metal TV" for MIYAKO of the female metal band LOVEBITES.
 In December, "2020 Musical Instruments Fair Online" will be held from the studio "AMP UP", where a variety of contents will be distributed, mainly about YAMAHA.

 2021
 February 14: Haruki Murakami Produced "MURAKAMI JAM～No Bossa Nova Blame it on the Bossa Nova～" for the 50th anniversary of TOKYO FM.
 May:   Took charge of filming for "SUGIYAMA KIYOTAKA The open air live "High & High" 2021" by Kiyotaka Sugiyama & Omega Tribe.
 Sep Edited Nakamura Naka's DVD "I" "LIVE2021 Bokura ha Hanninmae".
 Started planning and production of Kotaro Oshio's YouTube "Oshio's Guess" and was involved as a director.
 She directed and produced Marty Friedman's music video "For a Friend. He also appeared in the live streaming just before the release of the video with the same artist.

 2022
 Appears in a promotional video for YAMAHA's SYNCROOM. He also produced the video.
  EP "RED Episode 1" is released. Pianist/arranger Jun Abe and guitarist Jun Tsunoda participated in the music production.

Actress/DJ 

 2014 
 "Expedia "TV commercial 　。

 2016 
 YouTube "ITSUKA morning TV" has started　。
 DJ at Tokyo Motor Cycle Show2016』Ducati・booth　。
 DJ at ABARTH SHOTO "Italian Night Out"　。
 Demonstrator at "Musical Instruments Fair2016』　。

2018
 Performed at  Tokyo Dorm『Japan Grand Prix International Orchid Festival 2018』with flower artist Yuji Kobayashi.

Personal life
She's known as a big fan of the cocktail Red Eye. ITSUKA is the chief of the Red Eye cocktail committee  "RED EYE LOVERS".

Discography

Single

Album

References

External links 
  ITSUKA Official Website
 AMP UP
  ITSUKA Official YouTube Channel
 YouTube  ITSUKA TV
 Instagram
 Twitter
 Facebook
 RED EYE LOVERS

Living people
Japanese women singer-songwriters
Japanese women pop singers
20th-century Japanese women singers
20th-century Japanese singers
21st-century Japanese women singers
21st-century Japanese singers
Year of birth missing (living people)